The 2001 Meath Senior Football Championship was the 109th edition of the Meath GAA's premier club Gaelic football tournament for senior graded teams in County Meath, Ireland. The tournament consists of 16 teams, with the winner going on to represent Meath in the Leinster Senior Club Football Championship. The championship starts with a group stage and then progresses to a knock out stage.  
 
Dunshaughlin were the defending champions after they defeated Kilmainhamwood in the previous years final, and on 4 November 2001, they successfully defended their title with a 0–11 to 1–5 win over Skryne to claim their 2nd Senior Championship title in a row and 2nd in all. Ciaran Byrne lifted the Keegan Cup for Dunshaughlin while Martin Reilly claimed the 'Man of the Match' award.

St. Patrick's were promoted after claiming the 2000 Meath Intermediate Football Championship title, their third Intermediate win.

Navan O'Mahonys were relegated after 45 years in the senior grade. Only Skryne and Trim have operated at senior level for longer.
Syddan were also relegated after 2 years as a senior club.

Team changes
The following teams have changed division since the 2000 championship season.

To S.F.C.
Promoted from I.F.C.
 St. Patrick's  -  (Intermediate Champions)

From S.F.C.
Relegated to I.F.C.
 Moynalvey
 Blackhall Gaels

Group stage

Group A

Round 1:
 Seneschalstown 2-6, 0-9 Summerhill, Trim, 25/4/2001,
 Walterstown 2-11, 0-6 St. Patrick's, Duleek, 25/4/2001,
 Trim  -  Bye,

Round 2:
 Walterstown 3-5, 1-8 Trim, Dunsany, 9/5/2001,
 St. Patrick's 1-7, 0-9 Summerhill, Walterstown, 13/5/2001,
 Seneschalstown  -  Bye,

Round 3:
 Walterstown 0–15, 2-9 Summerhill, Dunsany, 10/6/2001,
 Trim 2-11, 1-13 Seneschalstown, Kilmessan, 10/6/2001,
 St. Patrick's  -  Bye,

Round 4:
 Walterstown 0-13, 1-6 Seneschalstown, Pairc Tailteann, 29/6/2001,
 St. Patrick's 0-16, 0-5 Trim, Dunsany, 30/6/2001,
 Summerhill  -  Bye,

Round 5:
 Seneschalstown 1-14, 0-9 St. Patrick's, Donore, 21/7/2001,
 Trim 0-14, 1-9 Summerhill, Longwood, 21/7/2001,
 Walterstown  -  Bye,

Quarter-final Playoff:
 Game 1: St. Patrick's 3-8, 2-10 Seneschalstown, Donore, 14/8/2011,
 Game 2: Trim 1-15, 2-9 St. Patrick's, Dunsany, 30/9/2001,

Group B

Round 1:
 Kilmainhamwood 1-5, 0-6 Simonstown Gaels, Kells, 22/4/2001,
 Dunshaughlin 0-12, 0-7 Ballinlough, Pairc Tailteann, 27/4/2001,

Round 2:
 Simonstown Gaels 1-13, 1-6 Dunshaughlin, Dunsany, 11/5/2001,
 Kilmainhamwood 3-7, 1-12 Ballinlough, Kells, 13/5/2001,

Round 3:
 Dunshaughlin 2-13, 1-9 Kilmainhamwood, Pairc Tailteann, 9/6/2001,
 Ballinlough 1-14, 0-12 Simonstown Gaels, Kells, 9/6/2001,

Preliminary Relegation Playoff:
 Simonstown Gaels 0-10, 0-7 Ballinlough, Kells, 7/10/2001,

Group C

Round 1:
 Gaeil Colmcille 0-11, 1-6 Syddan, Carlanstown, 22/4/2001, 
 Skryne 1-10, 0-4 Oldcastle, Pairc Tailteann, 22/4/2001,

Round 2:
 Skryne 0–10, 1-7 Syddan, Kilberry, 13/5/2001,
 Oldcastle 0-7, 0-5 Gaeil Colmcille, Kilskyre, 13/5/2001,

Round 3:
 Oldcastle 1-11, 0-11 Syddan, Carlanstown, 10/6/2001,
 Skryne 4-15, 1-1 Gaeil Colmcille, Pairc Tailteann, 10/6/2001,

Group D

Round 1:
 St. Peter's Dunboyne 2-7, 0-2 Navan O'Mahonys, Dunsany, 24/4/2001,
 Cortown 3-8, 1-12 Dunderry, Pairc Tailteann, 24/4/2001,

Round 2:
 Dunderry 2-7, 1-8 Navan O'Mahonys, Athboy, 13/5/2001,
 Cortown 0–7, 1-4 St. Peter's Dunboyne, Trim, 22/5/2001 

Round 3:
 Dunderry 0-11, 0-10 St. Peter's Dunboyne, Dunshaughlin, 10/6/2001,
 Cortown 3–4, 1-10 Navan O'Mahonys, Kells, 10/6/2001,

Knock-out Stage

Relegation Finals

 Summerhill 0-6, 1-2 Navan O'Mahonys, Dunsany, 14/10/2001,
 Ballinlough 3-8, 1-10 Syddan, Kells, 28/10/2001,

Finals

Quarter-final:
 Dunderry 1-10, 1-3 Trim, Pairc Tailteann, 6/10/2001,
 Dunshaughlin 3-7, 2-8 Oldcastle, Kells, 7/10/2001,
 Skryne 1-10, 1-8 Kilmainhamwood, Pairc Tailteann, 7/10/2001,
 Walterstown 0-9, 0-8 Cortown, Pairc Tailteann, 7/10/2001,

Semi-final:
 Dunshaughlin 1-11, 2-7 Walterstown, Pairc Tailteann, 21/10/2001,
 Skryne 1-11, 1-8 Dunderry, Pairc Tailteann, 21/10/2001,

Final:
 Dunshaughlin 0-11, 1-5 Skryne, Pairc Tailteann, 4/11/2001,

References

External links

Meath Senior Football Championship
Meath Senior Football Championship